Whitney is an unincorporated community in Westmoreland County, Pennsylvania, United States. Whitney has a post office, with ZIP code 15693.

References

Unincorporated communities in Westmoreland County, Pennsylvania
Unincorporated communities in Pennsylvania